Wannabe Jalva is a space groove rock band formed in 2011 by Tiago Abrahão (guitar/bass/seq), Felipe Puperi (vocal/guitar), Rafael Rocha (vocal/guitar/bass) and Fernando Paulista (drums) in Porto Alegre, Brazil.

Biography

Wannabe Jalva began playing their self-proclaimed "uterus space-groove rock" in 2010. Over the past four years, the band has solidified their status as hometown heroes.  In 2011, they were invited to play the inaugural MECAFestival in Porto Alegre, playing alongside Two Door Cinema Club and Vampire Weekend.  That summer they released their debut EP, Welcome To Jalva, which had fans and critics immediately hooked on their sound.  The record featured the hit single "Follow It" which was featured on an episode of CSI: NY.  Wannabe Jalva closed out the year with a slot opening for Pearl Jam and Los Angeles punk rock band X at Zequinha Stadium (20,000 capacity).  Pearl Jam hand selected Wannabe Jalva after considering a number of Brazilian bands for the opening slot and Eddie Vedder praised their set, commenting "They were quite good!" as he waved his arms in the air with excitement.
Receiving great feedback from critics and Brazilian music blogs, Wannabe Jalva's live following grew throughout Brazil via extensive touring in 2012.  They were invited back to MECAFestival to play alongside The Rapture, Mayer Hawthorne and other top-tier artists, as well as a gig at Lupaluna, the second largest festival in the south of Brazil.  To celebrate what turned out to be a fantastic year, Wannabe Jalva released So Long, 2012 – a special two song collection featuring a Justice x Led Zeppelin mashup titled "On'n'On meets Kashmir" and a live version of "Full of Grace," a track from Welcome To Jalva.  In 2013, Wannabe Jalva was invited to play Lollapalooza Brazil in São Paulo.

Collecture EP

They began to work on new material in 2013 in a kind of reclusion state of mind. Countless nights were spent locked inside Rafael's large glass-windowed basement, overlooking the coastal cityscape.  The band found themselves locked in a lo-fi groove, oscillating from explosive to intimate sounds, with walls of reverb driving through simple grooves. This journey through sidereal environments and textures became the foundation for Collecture. 
"We've extracted moods and textures from ourselves and put them out there in an almost collective epiphany…That’s where 'collective' comes from in naming the EP, our collective kind of labor. By 'nature' we mean that we realized that the right path (the essence) was to lock ourselves in there (in this basement) and just get out when we all felt fulfilled (and, at the same time, empty from those temporarily undefined urges)."
Following a similar format to their debut, Collecture is produced by the band members themselves, mixed by Tiago, and mastered by Brian Lucey.

Discography

Albums
 Welcome to Jalva (2011)

EPs
 Collecture (2014)

Singles
 The Way (2013)

References

External links
Wannabe Jalva website
Facebook Page
 

2011 establishments in Brazil
Musical groups established in 2011
Brazilian space rock musical groups